Natasha Pincus is an Australian creative film maker. Pincus has created music videos for a number of Australian musicians, including Powderfinger, Paul Kelly, Gotye, Missy Higgins, The Paper Kites and Sarah Blasko. Pinctus created a major film work for the Australian premiere production of David Bowie's Lazarus stage show, for which she conceived of and directed 16 narratively-connected Bowie music videos.

Pincus has written more than 20 feature film and TV scripts for projects in Australia and the USA. Pincus is also a qualified lawyer and research scientist.

Awards and nominations

ARIA Music Awards
The ARIA Music Awards is an annual awards ceremony that recognises excellence, innovation, and achievement across all genres of Australian music. They commenced in 1987. 

! 
|-
| 2011
| Natasha Pincus for Gotye featuring Kimbra's "Somebody That I Used to Know"
|rowspan="2" | Best Video
| 
|rowspan="2" |  
|-
| 2012
| Natasha Pincus for Missy Higgins'	"Everyone's Waiting"
| 
|-

Inside Film Awards
The Inside Film Awards (now known as the IF Awards) is an annual awards ceremony and broadcast platform for the Australian film industry. It ran from 2007-2008 and 2010.

! 
|-
| 2012
| Natasha Pincus for Paul Kelly's "God Told Me to"
| The 3 IF Award for Best Music Video
| 
|

J Awards
The J Awards are an annual series of Australian music awards that were established by the Australian Broadcasting Corporation's youth-focused radio station Triple J. They commenced in 2005.

|-
| J Awards of 2011
| Natasha Pincus for "Somebody That I Used to Know"
| Australian Video of the Year
| 
|-

MTV Awards
The MTV Video Music Awards (commonly abbreviated as the VMAs) is an award show presented by the cable channel MTV to honour the best in the music video medium.

! 
|-
| 2012
| Natasha Pincus for Gotye featuring Kimbra's "Somebody That I Used to Know"
| MTV Video Music Award for Best Editing
| 
|

References

External Links
 https://www.imdb.com/name/nm1882224/
 http://www.natashapincus.com/

Australian film directors
ARIA Award winners
Year of birth missing (living people)
Living people
Australian documentary filmmakers
Australian music video directors